Tête du Géant is a mountain in the Chablais Alps on the Swiss-French border.

References

External links
Tête du Géant on Summitpost

Mountains of the Alps
Mountains of Valais
Mountains of Haute-Savoie
France–Switzerland border
International mountains of Europe
Mountains of Switzerland